Trice is a surname found in English-speaking countries.

Notable people bearing it include:
 Amelia Trice (1936–2011), Native American leader

 Bob Trice (1926–1988), pitcher for Philadelphia and Kansas City Athletics
 George Trice (born 1983), American singer on season 2 of American Idol
 Jack Trice (1902–1923), American football player
 Obie Trice (born 1977), American rapper
 Richard Trice (1917–2000), American blues guitarist, singer and songwriter
 Travis Trice (born 1993), American basketball player
 Tyrone Trice (born 1963), American boxer
 Wally Trice (born 1966), American baseball player
 Willie Trice (1908–1976), American blues guitarist, singer and songwriter